Tobias Reichmann (born 27 May 1988) is a German handball player for TV Emsdetten and the German national team.

Achievements
Summer Olympics:
: 2016
European Championship:
: 2016
EHF Champions League:
: 2010, 2012, 2016
IHF Super Globe:
: 2011
 National Championship of Germany:
 : 2010, 2012
National Cup of Germany:
 : 2010, 2011
 German Super Cup:
 : 2011

Individual awards
 All-Star Right wing of the European Championship: 2016

References

External links

1988 births
Living people
Handball players from Berlin
German male handball players
HSG Wetzlar players
THW Kiel players
Vive Kielce players
SC Magdeburg players
MT Melsungen players
Handball-Bundesliga players
Olympic handball players of Germany
Handball players at the 2016 Summer Olympics
Medalists at the 2016 Summer Olympics
Olympic bronze medalists for Germany
Olympic medalists in handball
Expatriate handball players in Poland
German expatriate sportspeople in Poland